Ecbolium is a genus of flowering plants in the family Acanthaceae.

Selected species
 Ecbolium albiflorum 
 Ecbolium amplexicaule   Vollesen
 Ecbolium barlerioides  S.Moore
 Ecbolium benoistii  (S.Moore) Lindau 
 Ecbolium boranense  Vollesen
 Ecbolium clarkei  Vollesen 
 Ecbolium fimbriatum  Hiern
 Ecbolium flanaganii  C.B.Clarke 
 Ecbolium glabratum  Vollesen
 Ecbolium gymnostachyum  (Jacq.) Juss.
 Ecbolium hastatum  Vollesen
 Ecbolium humbertii  Vollesen 
 Ecbolium ligustrinum  (Vahl) Vollesen
 Ecbolium madagascariense  Vollesen 
 Ecbolium oblongifolium  Vollesen 
 Ecbolium palmatum  Vollesen
 Ecbolium strictum  O.Schwartz
 Ecbolium subcordatum  C.B.Clarke
 Ecbolium syringifolium  (Vahl) Vollesen
 Ecbolium tanzaniense  Vollesen
 Ecbolium viride  (Forssk.) Alston

References

Acanthaceae
Acanthaceae genera